The following is a list of mayors of Damascus since 1918.

List of officeholders (1918–present)

See also
Damascus
History of Damascus
Timeline of Damascus
List of governors of Aleppo
List of governors of Homs

References

External links
ولاة ورؤساء بلديات دمشق (List of Damascus governors and mayors); (in Arabic)

Damascus
History of Damascus
Rulers of Damascus
Syria politics-related lists